South Dartmoor Community College (SDCC) is a co-educational academy school located in Ashburton, Devon, England. The number of students on roll is 1,650. The school has a sixth form centre and has become a Specialist Sports College with Training School Status that is strongly linked with Ashmoor Hockey Club.

Trust and Academy status
From September 2007, South Dartmoor Community College became a Trust School. It is now part of the South Dartmoor Multi Academy Trust, along with: Ashburton Primary School, Atrium Studio School, Buckfastleigh Primary School, Glendinning House, Ilsington Church of England Primary School, Moretonhampstead Primary School, Widecombe-in-the-moor Primary School, The Ashmoor Sports Centre, and Ashmoor South Brent Fitness Centre.

On 1 April 2011, South Dartmoor Community College officially gained academy status.

In 2020 South Dartmoor Community College and Atrium Studio School joined The Westcountry Schools Trust (WeST).

Notable alumni

 Matt Jay, English professional footballer
 Chester Mojay-Sinclare, British entrepreneur
 Jamie Reid, Northern Irish professional footballer
 Ollie Watkins, England International professional footballer
 Josh Widdicombe, English stand-up comedian
 Bryony Frost, British National Jockey
 Ben Flower, Professional ballet dancer

References

External links
 School Website
 Ofsted Page

Training schools in England
Academies in Devon
Secondary schools in Devon
Educational institutions established in 1964
Ashburton, Devon
1964 establishments in England